Thomas Selby (4 November 1791 – 7 May 1874) was an English cricketer. He was born in Gillingham, Kent, and died on 7 May 1874 at Boulogne-sur-Mer in France. He played on the Kent cricket team from 1839 to 1841.

References

English cricketers
1791 births
1874 deaths
People from Gillingham, Kent
Kent cricketers